Amadio Freddi (1570–1634) was an Italian composer. He was Maestro di cappella of the Duomo of Treviso.

Works
 Primo libro de madrigali à sei voci 1605. 
 Secondo libro de madrigali a cinque voci 
 Quarto libro de madrigal a cinque voci 1614
 Messa, Vespro et Compieta  1616 
 Motecta unica voce decantando, Venezia, 1623
 Antiphonae in Annuntiatione Beatae Mariae Virginis, 1642 (posthumous)

References

1570 births
1634 deaths
17th-century Italian composers
Italian male composers
17th-century male musicians